Jewel Records was an American independent record label, founded in 1963 by Stan Lewis and based in Shreveport, Louisiana. It had two subsidiary labels, Paula and Ronn. The first of many retail record stores, called Stan's Record Shop, was opened in 1948. Later, Stan Lewis purchased and reissued the catalogues of Cobra Records, Chief Records, USA Records and JOB Records.

Among the artists for Jewel/Paula/Ronn were Buster Benton, Frank Frost, Lowell Fulson, John Lee Hooker, Lightnin' Hopkins, John Fred and his Playboy Band, Toussaint McCall, The Uniques, Jerry McCain, Memphis Slim, Little Johnny Taylor, and Justin Wilson.

For a short time, the Paula label was distributed by Chess Records.

Later owned by Sue Records (unrelated to the New York-based Sue Records), Fuel 2000 owned and managed the Jewel/Paula/Ronn catalogues. The private IP holding company, 43 North Broadway, LLC., purchased the Jewel/Paula/Ronn catalogues through its acquisition of Fuel 2000 in 2015.

References

External links
The Jewel/Paula/Ronn story

Defunct record labels of the United States
Pop record labels
Record labels based in Louisiana